Ove Andersen may refer to:

Ove Andersen (athlete) (1899–1967), Finnish athlete
Ove Andersen (footballer) (born 1937), Danish footballer
Ove Andersen (politician) (1878–1928), Norwegian politician

See also
Ove Andersson (1938–2008), Swedish rally driver
Ove Andersson (footballer) (1916–1983), Swedish footballer